The Bem 550 was a standard gauge EMU formerly operated by Swiss Federal Railways on the Geneva - Bellegarde line between 1994 and 2014. It was equipped to run with French electric power (1500 V DC) and signalling systems.  They were built in 1994, based on the Lausanne metro line 1 EMUs, by  ACMV (Ateliers de Constructions Mécaniques de Vevey) in Villeneuve, with electrical equipment provided by ABB.

History

The Bem 550s (or Bem 4/6 as they were originally known) were built to replace two ageing and notoriously unreliable BDe 4/4 II railcars for the Geneva - la Plaine service, and introduced in 1995 under the Rhône Express Regional brand.

With increasing demand for both Geneva  la Plaine and Geneva Bellegarde services, in 2001, the Bem 550 units were modified (at a cost of 12 million CHF) to allow them to run beyond la Plaine to Bellegarde.

In 2014 the Bellegarde-Geneva section (SNCF Lyon-Genève railway line) was re-electrified at 25 kV AC 50 Hz. The Bem 550 vehicles thus are unable to operate in electric mode on the modernised tracks, but only in diesel mode, and were withdrawn from service on the Geneva-Bellegarde line. Since 2014 there are no longer any standard gauge railway lines electrified at 1500 V DC in Switzerland.

Technical details

The Bem 550 consists of two carriages, each with three swing-out doors (two doors on one side, one door on the other). There is a driving position at each end, with a large windscreen and side windows. The driver sits on the right hand side in the direction of travel. The Bem 550 is equipped for one-handed operation, meaning that driver can drive and brake with one control. It draws traction current though a single-armed pantograph. It is also equipped with an 88 kW diesel engine to enable it to drive to maintenance and storage sheds under Swiss standard 15 kV AC catenary. Prior to the UIC class name Bem550, they were called Bem 4/6.

Literature

References 

Multiple units of Switzerland
1500 V DC multiple units of France